Jorge de la Rúa (1942 – August 15, 2015) was an Argentine lawyer and former Government employee. He was a brother of former President of Argentina Fernando de la Rúa and was his Minister of Justice from 2000 until his brother's resignation.

References

See also
List of Argentine Secretaries of Intelligence

1942 births
2015 deaths
20th-century Argentine lawyers